Lelemadih/Bupichupeu Rural LLG is a local-level government (LLG) of Manus Province, Papua New Guinea.

Wards
01. Malapang
02. Horan
03. Powat
04. Maraman
05. Lapahan
06. N'Drakot
07. Lowa
08. Ahus
09. Yiringou
10. Bowat 1
11. Lundret
12. Rossum
13. Dungoumasih
14. Sapon 1
15. Warambei
16. Pityluh
17. N'drilou

References

Local-level governments of Manus Province